The Nashville Vols were a Minor League Baseball team that played in Nashville, Tennessee, from 1901 to 1963; they were inactive in 1962 due to declining attendance and the Southern Association (SA) ceasing operations after 1961. Over 62 seasons, the team was led by 26 managers. Managers are responsible for team strategy and leadership on and off the field, including determining the batting order, arranging defensive positioning, and making tactical decisions regarding pitching changes, pinch-hitting, pinch-running, and defensive replacements. Competing in an era when it was common to have player-managers, 17 men served as managers concurrent with their on-field playing. Vols managers led the club for 9,015 regular season games in which they compiled a win–loss record of 4,569–4,446 (.507). Their teams qualified for postseason playoffs on 16 occasions and had a postseason record of 108–74 (.593).

The Nashville Baseball Club was formed as a charter member of the newly organized Southern Association in 1901. The team did not receive its official moniker, the Nashville Volunteers, until 1908. However, the team was, and is, commonly referred to as the Vols. Their last season in the Southern Association was 1961. After sitting out the 1962 season, Nashville returned for a final campaign as a part of the South Atlantic League in 1963.

The team won eight regular season pennants, nine playoff championships, and four Dixie Series titles behind seven different managers. Newt Fisher (1901 and 1902), Bill Bernhard (1908), Roy Ellam (1916), and Larry Gilbert (1940, 1943, 1948, and 1949) managed the Vols to win the Southern Association pennant. Gilbert (1939, 1940, 1941, 1942, 1943, and 1944), Rollie Hemsley (1949), Don Osborn (1950), and Hugh Poland (1953) led the team to win SA playoff championships. Gilbert (1940, 1941, and 1942) and Hemsley (1949) managed Nashville to win the Dixie Series, a best-of-seven playoff series between the champions of the Southern Association and Texas League.

Larry Gilbert won 821 games from 1939 to 1948, placing him first on the all-time wins list for Vols managers. Having managed the team for 1,471 games, 10 full seasons, he was also the longest-tenured manager in team history. The manager with the highest winning percentage over a full season or more was Rollie Hemsley, whose 1949 team had a .625 winning percentage. Conversely, the lowest winning percentage over a season or more is .328 by manager Mickey Finn in 1906.

Table key

Managers

Notes

References
Specific

General

Managers